The 2021 Brussels Cycling Classic was the 101st edition of the Brussels Cycling Classic road cycling one day race, which was held on 28 August 2021 as part of the 2021 UCI Europe Tour and the 2021 UCI ProSeries calendars.

The 2021 edition featured a more hilly and undulating course than those of the past few editions, with two ascents of the Muur van Geraardsbergen among the several cobbled climbs along the  route. Evenepoel rode across the finish line solo to take his second one-day race victory in three days, having won Druivenkoers Overijse two days prior. De Gendt held on for second while Tosh Van der Sande won the bunch sprint to compete the podium.

Teams 
Of the 138 riders who started the race, 88 finished.

UCI WorldTeams

 
 
 
 
 
 

UCI ProTeams

 
 
 
 
 
 
 
 
 

UCI Continental Teams

Result

References

External links 

2021 Brussels Cycling Classic
Brussels Cycling Classic
Brussels Cycling Classic
Brussels Cycling Classic
Brussels Cycling Classic